Transmembrane and coiled-coil domain 6, TMCO6, is a protein that in humans is encoded by the TMCO6 gene with aliases of PRO1580, HQ1580 or FLJ39769.1.

Gene 

The human TMCO6 is found on chromosome 5 (position 5q31.3). The entire gene spans 5568 base pairs on the positive strand of chromosome 5 (140019113-140024689bp) but is alternately spliced into different variants. There are three known variants for TMCO6. Variant 1 is the longest and variant 2 and 3 are spliced into shorter mRNA strands. There is also a predicted variants X1-X7.

Expression 

TMCO6 is expressed in liver tissue and is found during the fetal stage of development in humans.

Homology 

Orthologs of the TMCO6 protein have been found among sequenced organisms with the exception of invertebrates, fungi, plants and bacteria. Tmco6 (transmembrane and coiled-coil domains 6) - Rat Genome Database. This includes close primates to some distant fish. Graphs show the evolutionary rate of TMCO6 with respect to different species and compared to other proteins. It is concluded that TMCO6 is a fairly fast evolving protein, similar to fibrinogen.

Transcription 

There are four known isoforms associated with this gene/protein (1, 2, 3 and X2). The longest variant of TMCO6 is variant 1, encoded by a 12-exon long, 1,925 base pair mRNA sequence. Variant 2 is the second longest at 1,907 base pairs in length and also consists of 12 exons. This transcript variant has an alternate splice site in the central coding region that does not alter the reading frame.  Variant 3 has a total length of 1,614 base pairs and differs from variant 1 because it lacks two consecutive exons. It has an alternative splice site in the 5’ region that causes the translation to initiate downstream at an in frame AUG. Variant X2 is predicted using computational analysis and is 1,892 base pairs in length.

Protein 

The TMCO6 protein is found in the membrane and is considered a multi-pass membrane protein. There is evidence of its presence in the nucleus, cytosol, ER, mitochondria and the plasma membrane. The predicted molecular weight of Isoform 1 in humans, but is conserved, is 55kDa. Variant 1 is translated into a 499 amino acid sequence isoform. Isoform 2, encoded by transcript variant 2, is 493 amino acids in length and has a predicted molecular weight of 54 kDa. Transcript variant 3 encodes isoform 3 which is the shortest protein because of its spliced N-terminus. Isoform 3 is 253 amino acids in length with a molecular weight of 28kDa.

Domains and motifs 

Evidence of two reserved ARM superfamily domains are shown in the TMCO6 protein. The ARM domain, Armadillo/ beta-catenin-like-repeat, is about a 40 amino acid long tandem repeat that forms superhelix of helices. Another feature is that TMCO6 has an Arginine rich region that is within the coil-coiled region. This indicates that the Arg rich area might be an important structural feature of the coiled-coil region. There are 17 regions for protein binding, 2 transmembrane domains and an addition of a poly-A tail to the mRNA. An SRP1 is also found from the 23-399 amino acids. The SRP1 domain is Karyopherin(importin) alpha.  This is involved in the exchange of molecules from the nucleus and the cytoplasm. The exchange involves the active transport by a carrier protein called karyopherins. A di-leucine motif is also abundant in TMCO6. This motif is commonly known to be a lysosome targeting motif. A nuclear localization sequence of 5 positive amino acids is found near the 5' end indicating its transport to the nucleus.

Structure 

The 5' and 3' end of TMCO6 is predicted to be located on the cytoplasmic side of the membrane. There is a small portion located in the non-cytoplasmic side.

Function 

Function of the conserved ARM domain and SRP1 domains are known. The ARM domains play a role in mediating the interaction of beta-catenin with its ligand.  They are responsible for transduction of the Wnt signal, intracellular signaling and cytoskeletal regulation. The SRP1 domain encodes alpha-Karyopherin (importin) and is known for intracellular trafficking and secretion on the membrane. TMCO6 is thought to be involved in the transport of molecules through the nuclear membrane.

Interactions 

Two-hybrid experimental evidence suggests UBQLN1, or ubiquilin 1, has a high potential to interact with TMCO6.

References

Further reading